Jean-Louis Morin (1953 – 24 May 1995) was a Canadian choreographer and the principal dancer for the Martha Graham Dance Company.

Born in Val-David, Quebec, he made his debut with the Groupe de la Place Royale in Montreal, then with the Toronto Dance Theatre in Toronto, Ontario.

He was introduced to experimental cinema via the Canadian filmmaker Norman McLaren's short musical film Narcissus, for which he was the principal actor/dancer as the beautiful Narcissus.

Know also as a painter and sculptor, he died of complications from AIDS, according to a friend, Doneley Meris.

Films
 Narcissus as "Narcissus" (1983)

References

External links
 

1953 births
1995 deaths
AIDS-related deaths in Canada
Canadian choreographers
Canadian contemporary dancers
People from Laurentides
20th-century Canadian dancers